Margaret Mary Alacoque, VHM (22 July 1647 – 17 October 1690), was a French Catholic Visitation nun and mystic who promoted devotion to the Sacred Heart of Jesus in its modern form.

Summary
She worked to prove the genuineness of her vocation and her visions of Jesus and Mary relating to the Sacred Heart.  She was initially rebuffed by her mother superior and was unable to convince theologians of the validity of her visions and revelations.  A noted exception was the Jesuit Claude de la Colombière, later a canonized saint, who supported her. The devotion to the Sacred Heart was officially recognized 75 years after Alacoque's death.

Early life
Alacoque was born in 1647 in L'Hautecour, Burgundy, France, now part of the commune of Verosvres, then in the Duchy of Burgundy, the only daughter of Claude and Philiberte Lamyn Alacoque, who also had several sons. From early childhood, Margaret was described as showing intense love for the Blessed Sacrament, and as preferring silence and prayer to childhood play.

After her First Communion at the age of nine, she practiced in secret severe corporal mortification, until rheumatic fever confined her to bed for four years. At the end of this period, having made a vow to the Blessed Virgin Mary to consecrate herself to religious life, it is said she was instantly restored to perfect health. In recognition of this favor, she added the name "Mary" to her baptismal name of Margaret. According to her later account of her life, she had visions of Jesus Christ, which she thought were a normal part of human experience and continued to practice austerity.

Alacoque lost her father at a young age, and the family's assets were held by a relative who refused to hand them over, plunging her family into poverty. During this time, her only consolation was frequent visits to pray before the Blessed Sacrament in the local church. When she was 17, however, the family regained their fortune and her mother encouraged her to socialize, in the hopes of her finding a suitable husband. Out of obedience, and believing that her childhood vow was no longer binding, she began to accompany her brothers in the social events, attending dances and balls.

One night, after returning home from a ball for Carnival dressed in her finery, she experienced a vision of Christ, scourged and bloody. He reproached her for her forgetfulness of him; yet he also reassured her by demonstrating that his heart was filled with love for her, because of the childhood promise she had made to his Blessed Mother. As a result, she determined to fulfill her vow and entered, when almost 24 years of age, the Visitation Convent at Paray-le-Monial on 25 May 1671, intending to become a nun.

Monastic life

Alacoque was subjected to many trials to prove the genuineness of her vocation. She was admitted to wearing the religious habit on 25 August 1671, but was not allowed to make her religious profession on the same date of the following year, which would have been normal. A fellow novice described Margaret Mary as humble, simple and frank, but above all kind and patient. Finally, she was admitted to profession on 6 November 1672. It is said that she was assigned to the infirmary and was not very skillful at her tasks.

Visions
In this monastery Alacoque received several private revelations of the Sacred Heart, the first on 27 December 1673 and the final one 18 months later. The visions revealed to her the form of the devotion, the chief features being reception of Holy Communion on the first Friday of each month, Eucharistic adoration during a "Holy hour" on Thursdays, and the celebration of the Feast of the Sacred Heart. She stated that in her vision she was instructed to spend an hour every Thursday night to meditate on Jesus' Agony in the Garden of Gethsemane. The Holy Hour practice later became widespread among Catholics.

On 27 December 1673, the feast of St. John, Margaret Mary said that Jesus had permitted her to rest her head upon his heart, and then disclosed to her the wonders of his love, telling her that he desired to make them known to all mankind and to diffuse the treasures of his goodness, and that he had chosen her for this work.

Initially discouraged in her efforts to follow the instruction she had received in her visions, Alacoque was eventually able to convince her superior, Mother de Saumaise, of the authenticity of her visions. She was unable, however, to convince a group of theologians of the validity of her apparitions, nor was she any more successful with many of the members of her own community, and suffered greatly at their hands. She eventually received the support of Claude de la Colombière, the community's confessor for a time, who declared that the visions were genuine. In 1683, opposition in the community ended when Mother Melin was elected Superior and named Margaret Mary her assistant. She later became Novice Mistress, and saw the monastery observe the Feast of the Sacred Heart privately, beginning in 1686. Two years later, a chapel was built at Paray-le-Monial to honor the Sacred Heart.

In 1689, Alacoque received a private request from Jesus to urge the King of France, Louis XIV, to consecrate the nation to the Sacred Heart, so that he may be "triumphant over all the enemies of Holy Church." Louis XIV, along with his successors, Louis XV and Louis XVI failed to consecrate the nation, and 100 years after Alcoque's vision, Louis XVI was stripped of his power in 1789, during the events of the French Revolution.

Alacoque died on 17 October 1690.

Veneration

After Alacoque the devotion to the Sacred Heart was fostered by the Jesuits and the subject of controversies within the Catholic Church. The practice was not officially recognized until 75 years later.

The discussion of Alacoque's own mission and qualities continued for years. All her actions, her revelations, her spiritual maxims, her teachings regarding the devotion to the Sacred Heart, of which she was the chief exponent as well as the apostle, were subjected to the most severe and minute examination, and finally the Sacred Congregation of Rites passed a favourable vote on the heroic virtues of this "servant of God". In March 1824, Pope Leo XII pronounced her Venerable and on 18 September 1864 Pope Pius IX declared her Blessed.  When her tomb was canonically opened in July 1830, two instantaneous cures were recorded to have taken place. Her incorrupt body rests above the side altar in the Chapel of the Apparitions, located at the Visitation Monastery in Paray-le-Monial, and many striking blessings have been claimed by pilgrims attracted there from all parts of the world.

Alacoque was canonized by Pope Benedict XV in 1920, and in 1929 her liturgical commemoration was included in the General Roman calendar for celebration on 17 October, the day of her death. In the reforms of 1969, the feast day was moved to the prior day, 16 October.

In his 1928 encyclical Miserentissimus Redemptor, Pope Pius XI affirmed the Catholic Church's position regarding the credibility of her visions of Jesus Christ by speaking of Jesus as having "manifested Himself" to Alacoque and having "promised her that all those who rendered this honour to His Heart would be endowed with an abundance of heavenly graces".

Alacoque's short devotional writing, La Devotion au Sacré-Coeur de Jesus (Devotion to the Sacred Heart of Jesus), was published posthumously by J. Croiset in 1698, and has been popular among Catholics.

On the Caribbean island of Saint Lucia there are two flower festivals supported by their Societies.  Each society has a patron saint on whose feast day the grande fete is celebrated. For the Roses it is the feast of St. Rose of Lima on 30 August; and for the Marguerites it is that of St. Margaret Mary Alacocque, 17 October.

Quote

Popular culture
In James Joyce's short story "Eveline", in his book Dubliners, a "coloured print of the promises made to Blessed Margaret Mary Alacoque" is mentioned as part of the decorations of an Irish home at the turn of the 20th century, testifying to Joyce's fine eye for the details of Irish Catholic piety.

In J. K. Huysmans's controversial novel La-Bas (The Damned), Saint Mary Alacoque is said to have mortified herself through means involving two of her sick patients.

See also
 Act of Consecration to the Sacred Heart of Jesus
 First Fridays Devotion
 The  amulet used by Spanish soldiers is said to derive from Alacoque's emblems.

Notes

References
 

Gaddis, William.  The Recognitions.  Penguin Classics, New York, New York. 1993, pp. 66–67.

External links

 Sanctuary of Paray-le-Monial | Saint Margaret Mary Alacoque
  The Life of Saint Margaret Mary Alacoque in her own words
 La Vie de Saint Marguerite-Marie Alacoque – Biography in French (1923)
 Sacred Heart Altar in St Peter's Basilica

1647 births
1690 deaths
17th-century French nuns
Visitandine nuns
People from Paray-le-Monial
French Roman Catholic saints
17th-century Christian saints
Roman Catholic mystics
Sacred Heart devotions
Incorrupt saints
Visions of Jesus and Mary
Christian female saints of the Early Modern era
French Christian mystics
Visitandine mystics
17th-century Christian mystics
Canonizations by Pope Benedict XV
Women mystics